Hot Bread is a 2018 Uzbekistani drama film directed by Umid Khamdamov. It was selected as the Uzbekistani entry for the Best International Feature Film at the 92nd Academy Awards, but it was not nominated. It was the first time that Uzbekistan had submitted a film for the Best International Feature Film Oscar.

Plot
A teenage girl longs to move away from her village to live with her mother in the city.

Cast
 Zarina Ergasheva as Zulfiya
 Feruza Saidova as Zulfiya's mother
 Munavvara Abdullayeva as Zulfiya's grandmother

See also
 List of submissions to the 92nd Academy Awards for Best International Feature Film
 List of Uzbekistani submissions for the Academy Award for Best International Feature Film

References

External links
 

2018 films
2018 drama films
Uzbekistani drama films